The Pittsburgh Steelers Radio Network is an American radio network composed of 39 radio stations which carry English-language coverage of the Pittsburgh Steelers, a professional football team in the National Football League (NFL).

Since 2013, co-owned Pittsburgh market stations WDVE and WBGG have served as the network's two flagships. The network also includes 37 affiliates in the U.S. states of Pennsylvania, Georgia, Maryland, New Jersey, Ohio, Virginia, and West Virginia: eighteen AM stations, fifteen of which supplement their signals with a low-power FM translator; and nineteen full-power FM stations.

Station list

Blue background indicates low-power FM translator.
Gray background indicates station is a simulcast of another station.

References

External links

National Football League on the radio
Pittsburgh Steelers
Sports radio networks in the United States